Al-Suwaira District is part of the Wasit Governorate in eastern Iraq and is about 35 km south-east of Baghdad. The Tigris runs through it. Famous for its fruit and palm orchards, its seat is the city of Al-Suwaira.
Shaykh Mazhar Air Base is roughly 13 km west of the city of Al-Suwaira.

Districts of Wasit Governorate